St Mary's College Wellington is situated in the suburb of Thorndon in Wellington, New Zealand. The school is a state-integrated all-girls Catholic secondary school for years 9–13.

History
The school, which is one of the oldest existing schools in New Zealand, was founded in 1850 by Philippe Viard, first Bishop of Wellington and staffed from 1861 by a small group of religious sisters, the "Sisters of Mary", established by Viard. Part of the land on which the school is situated was donated by Lord Petre, the 11th Baron Petre (1793–1850), who was a director of the New Zealand Company and whose family seat Thorndon Hall in Essex was an important centre of Catholic Recusancy from the time of Queen Elizabeth I. Another part of the site was given by Sir George Grey, Governor of New Zealand out of public funds. In 1861 the school was taken over by the Sisters of Mercy (absorbing the earlier group) when they arrived in Wellington in that year. To begin with, the school was co-educational (boys and girls) and had a boarding facility attached. Nowadays the boarding facility is gone, and it is a single sex girls' school.

Buildings
While most traces of the original buildings on the site have disappeared, buildings dating from the twentieth century as the latest, including the "Gabriel Block" which is now used as the school hall. The other two main blocks are "Carlow" and "McAuley". McAuley is named after Sister Catherine McAuley, who used her inherited fortune to found the Sisters of Mercy in Dublin, Ireland. 

The school remains in the ownership of the Sisters of Mercy and describes itself as a "Mercy School". The Gabriel Hall and St Joseph's Providence Porch have Category II listings with the New Zealand Historic Places Trust. 

As most other New Zealand Schools do, students in years 11–13 sit NCEA (National Certificate of Educational Achievement) examinations.

Characteristics
 Number of Teachers: 33
 International Students: 4
 Ethnic make up of students: New Zealand European/Pākehā, 45%; Pacific, 22%; Māori, 16%; ; Asian, 14%; Other, 3%

See also
 Sacred Heart Cathedral School, Thorndon
 Sacred Heart Cathedral, Wellington
 Sisters of Mercy
 St Mary's Cathedral, Wellington
 St Patrick's College, Silverstream

Notable alumnae

 Margaret Butler (1883–1947) – sculptor.
 Pip Desmond – Author and journalist.
 Patricia Grace  (born 1937)  – writer.
 Ainsleyana Puleiata (born 2000) -  international netball player.
 Saviour Tui (born 2001) – Netball player; has represented Samoa internationally.
 Beverley Wakem  (born 1944) – Former Chief Ombudsman, president of the International Ombudsman Institute and chief executive of Radio New Zealand.
 Therese Walsh  (born 1971) – chief executive and business leader; chief operating officer for the 2011 Rugby World Cup and head of the organising body for the 2015 Cricket World Cup.
 Joy Watson (née Evans) (1938–2021) – author of children's books.
 Fran Wilde  (born 1948) – New Zealand politician, and former Wellington Labour member of parliament, Minister of Tourism and first female Mayor of Wellington.

References

References/Sources

 Lillian G. Keys, Philip Viard, Bishop of Wellington, Pegasus Press, Christchurch, 1968. 
 Ernest Richard Simmons, Brief history of the Catholic Church in New Zealand, Catholic Publications Centre, Auckland, 1978.
 Michael King, God's farthest outpost : a history of Catholics in New Zealand, Viking, Auckland 1997.  
 Mary de Porres Flannigan R.S.M., Mercy comes to Wellington : a history of St. Mary’s College, St. Mary’s College Board of Trustees, Wellington, 2000. 
 Michael O'Meeghan S.M., Steadfast in hope : the story of the Catholic Archdiocese of Wellington 1850–2000, Dunmore press, Palmerston North, 2003. 

Educational institutions established in 1850
Girls' schools in New Zealand
Catholic secondary schools in the Wellington Region
Schools in Wellington City
Sisters of Mercy schools
1850 establishments in New Zealand
Heritage New Zealand Category 2 historic places in the Wellington Region
Roman Catholic Archdiocese of Wellington